The Portuguese Faculdade de Ciências Sociais e Humanas (Faculty of Social and Human Sciences - FCSH) is an organic unit of the Universidade NOVA de Lisboa (NOVA). According to its statutes, “the Faculty of Social and Human Sciences of NOVA University of Lisbon is an institution dedicated to education, scientific research and cultural creation". The Faculty's own identity stems from the coexistence of social sciences with humanities, allowing an unusual interdisciplinarity in the Portuguese higher education panorama.

General description 

FCSH/NOVA was established in January 1977 by Decree-Law No. 464/77, following the development of the area of Human and Social Sciences that existed at NOVA at the time, led by a group of faculty members and researchers, namely J. S. da Silva Dias, Leonor Buescu, João Morais Barbosa, Artur Nobre de Gusmão, Fernando Gil, Augusto Mesquitela Lima, A.H. de Oliveira Marques, José Augusto França, Vitorino Magalhães Godinho, José Mattoso, Raquel Soeiro de Brito, Teolinda Gersão, Leonor Machado de Sousa, Yvete Kace Centeno and Teresa Rita Lopes. The Faculty began its activity on 2 January 1978.

The FCSH is located at Av. Berna, in the centre of Lisbon, next to the Calouste Gulbenkian Foundation. Based on a barracks that belonged to the military, the Faculty's facilities are divided into B1 and B2 buildings (classrooms and departments), Tower A (classrooms and head office of the Languages Institute of the Universidade NOVA de Lisboa - ILNOVA]), Tower B (departments, and the Mário Sottomayor Cardia Library), boards of management, administrative services, cafeteria, Students Association and, since 2009, the ID building (Research and PhD degrees). This building, known as the former DRM (Military District Recruitment), has recently undergone a major change in order to be adapted to the new objectives it has been assigned. The core of the administrative support for PhD degrees, the research units associated with FCSH/NOVA and classrooms for the PhD programmes located in the ID building.

In addition to teaching areas (classrooms, lecture halls and auditoriums), the FCSH/NOVA also has various spaces for socialization, a printing centre and a large courtyard. To solve logistical issues created by recent growth, new facilities are scheduled for the FCSH/NOVA in the plans of the Campolide Campus, where other Faculties of the Universidade NOVA de Lisboa (NOVA) are already installed, such as the Faculdade de Economia (FE), the  Faculdade de Direito (FD) and the Instituto Superior de Estatística e Gestão de Informação (ISEGI). The Rectory of NOVA and the university residence Alfredo de Sousa are also located in the Campolide Campus.

Faculty structure
The Faculty Structure, according to the RJIES, has the following bodies:
 Faculty Council
 Dean
 Scientific Council
 Pedagogic Council
 Student Council

Composition and election of the Faculty Council
The Faculty Council is a representative University body composed of 13 members: eight faculty members or researchers (Ana Paiva Morais, António José Duque da Silva Marques, João Sàágua, Margarida Acciaiuoli, Maria Helena Trindade Lopes, Maria Regina Salvador, Nuno Severiano Teixeira, Salwa Castelo-Branco), one student (Ana Assunção), and four external personalities (Francisco Pinto Balsemão, Nazim Ahmad, António Vieira Monteiro e Francisco Seixas da Costa). Faculty members or researchers are elected for four years (with one possible renewal), whereas external individuals, chosen by the elected counsellors in their first meeting, are nominated by the Rector.

The Faculty Council has the power to:
 Elect its president, a position that is currently held by Francisco Pinto Balsemão.
 Elect a Dean (by absolute majority, among the Full Professors and research coordinators that integrate the Faculty)
 Evaluate the Dean's actions and adopt amendments to statutes.
 Upon a proposal by the Dean, adopt medium and long-term strategic options, as well as create, change or remove departments, research units or services
 Make decisions regarding the purchase or sale of assets
 Approve annual plans of activities, budgets and accounts.

The dean 
The dean, a position currently held by Francisco Caramelo, is elected for four years and may be renewed only once through an electoral process that begins three months before the mandate expires. The Dean may designate up to four Vice-Deans, positions currently held by Maria José Roxo, Susana Trovão and João Soeiro de Carvalho, and associate deans Cristina Ponte e João Figueira de Sousa.

Leaders

Presidents of the FCSH Installation Committee
December 1977 - November 1980: A. H. de Oliveira Marques
November 1980 - May 1981: J. S. da Silva Dias
May 1981 - May 1982: João Morais Barbosa

FCSH’s deans
May 1982 - December 1986: J. Manuel Nazareth
December 1986 - February 1988: José Mattoso
March 1988 - May 1993: Adriano Duarte Rodrigues
May 1993 - May 1996: J. Manuel Nazareth
May 1996 - June 2005: Jorge Crespo
June 2005 - July 2013: João Sàágua
July 2013 - February 2016: João Costa
 From February 2016 to today: Francisco Caramelo

Departments 
The FCSH/NOVA delegates the operation of its educational offer to its 12 Departments, as well as the support for scientific and technological development and dissemination of culture in the fields taught. The development of this mission is secured by the faculty members associated each Department - tenured and visiting - supported by a secretariat. The coordination of each department is taken up by a Coordinator appointed by the Dean from the tenured faculty members.

Research centres 

FCSH houses a total of 16 Research Centres, whose primary mission is the development of scientific research in different cultural areas of the social sciences and humanities, the education of researchers and the rendering of services to the community.

The Faculty is the only higher education institution in the Social Sciences and Humanities field with its own facilities dedicated to research centres and to PhD's (ID building), strengthening the desired association between research and PhD programmes.

Out of the 16 research centers, 13 were evaluated by international panels of FCT/MCTES - four with an "Excellent" grade and eight with a "Very Good" grade - launching the FCSH to a position of great importance in the national University panorama. Taken together, these centres captured 1.4 million  in funding in 2009.

Study cycles 
Today, the FCSH is the second largest unit of NOVA, both in student numbers, and in financial budget. It has more than 300 faculty members, almost all of them holding a PhD degree or with recognized prestige in their scientific area. It also has about 100 staff members. During the academic year 2015/16, the Faculty admitted a total of 4725 students, 2587 undergraduate, 1488 masters and 650 students for doctoral programs.

The FCSH teaching programme for the academic year 2016/2017 includes 14 undergraduate degrees, 46 masters programs and 28 PhD's, the latter two being exclusively developed during a night schedule.

The study cycle cover the traditionalSocial Sciences and Humanities fields, but also several thematic and interdisciplinary courses. In addition to a Summer School, the FCSH/NOVA also offers specialization degrees, free courses and, since 1997, a programme on Portuguese Language and Culture. This program is structured according to the six proficiency levels of the Common European Framework of Reference for Languages. It can be intensive (30 hours - 5 times per week), a semester (64 hours two times per week) or taught individually.

Annually, more than 400 students participate in the Mobility Programmes, of which the Erasmus Programme is the best known example. This is one of the examples of the FCSH/NOVA's internationalization strategy.

The BMSC is also a deposit for private donations given by inheritors of former teachers of FCSH: The Leonor Buescu Library (BLB) - 3000 volumes of broad scope, with greater relevance to the area of Linguistics and English Literature; the Luis Krus Library (BLK) - 2200 volumes on Portuguese and European Medieval History, Anthropology and Sociology; the António G. Mattoso Library (BM) - 8500 books of broader scope, with particular importance to the field of History, and the Mário Sottomayor Cardia Library  (BMSC) – 70,000 volumes, still not fully treated, that deal with issues of a general nature, with a particular emphasis on Philosophy and Political Science.

The BMSC also includes the bibliographic collection of the American Ladies Club (ALC) - 1000 volumes dedicated to Literature, as well as some personal libraries, as in the case of the Dragomir Knapic Library (BK) - 250 works on Geography; the Rodrigues Michaels Library (BRM) - 1400 works dedicated to the History of Literature and the António Rita Ferreira Library (BRF) - 850 books related to Anthropology, African Colonization, Ethno history of Africa and the John Catarino Library (BJC), containing 700 works on Archaeology.

The BMSC has integrated the properties of the departmental libraries of Anthropology, Art History and Musicology thus increasing its collection by an additional 10,000 books and acquiring the bibliographic collection of musicologist Macario Santiago Kastner.

Undergraduate programmes

 Anthropology
 Archaeology
 Communication Sciences
 Geography and Regional Planning
 History
 History of Art
 Language Sciences
 Languages, Literatures and Cultural Studies
 Musicology
 Philosophy
 Political Science and International Relations
 Portuguese Studies
 Sociology (daytime and after-work schedule)
 Translation

Master's Programmes
 Aesthetics and Artistic Studies
 Anthropology
 Archaeology
 Art History
 Communication Sciences
 Crossways in Cultural Narratives
 Cultural Heritage
 Editing and Publishing
 Educational Sciences
 E-Learning Systems Management
 English and Foreign Languages Teaching (German, Spanish, or French) in the third Cycle of Basic Education and Secondary Education
 English Language Teaching
 English Teaching in the first Cycle of Basic Education
 Geography Teaching in the third cycle of Basic Education and in Secondary Education
 History
 History of The Portuguese Empire
 Human Ecology
 Information Management and Curation
 Journalism
 Language Sciences
 Migration, Inter-Ethnicity and Transnationalism
 Modern Literatures and Cultures
 Museology
 Musical Arts
 Musicology
 New Media and Web Practices
 Performing Arts
 Philosophy
 Political Science and International Relations
 Portuguese as a Second and Foreign Language
 Portuguese Studies
 Science Communication
 Sociology
 Spatial Planning and Geographic Information Systems
 Sustainable Urbanism and Spatial Planning
 Teaching English in the third Cycle of Basic Education and in Secondary Education
 Teaching History in the third Cycle of Basic Education and in Secondary Education
 Teaching of Music in Basic Education (2nd cycle of Basic Education)
 Teaching Philosophy in Secondary Education
 Teaching Portuguese and a Foreign Language in the third Cycle of Basic Education and in Secondary Education
 Teaching Portuguese in the third Cycle of Basic Education and in Secondary Education
 Teaching Portuguese in the third Cycle of Basic Education and in Secondary Education and Latin in Secondary Education
 Territorial Management
 Translation
 Urban Studies
 Women's Studies. Women in Society and in Culture

PhD programmes
 Anthropology
 Artistic Studies | Art and Mediations
 Climate Changes and Sustainable Development Policy
 Communication Sciences
 Digital Media
 Education Sciences
 Geography and Territorial Planning
 Global Studies
 History
 History and Theory of Ideas
 History of Art
 Human Ecology
 International Relations
 Languages Teaching | Multilingualism and Education for a Global Citizenship
 Linguistics
 Medieval Studies
 Modern Literatures and Cultures
 Musical Arts | Music Dramaturgy and Staging | Instrumental or Vocal Performance
 Musicology
 Philosophy
 Political Science
 Portuguese Studies
 Sociology
 Translation and Terminology
 Translation Studies
 Urban Studies

Postgraduate studies
 Acoustics and Sound Studies
 Art Curatorship
 Art Market Postgraduate Program
 Globalization, Diplomacy and Security
 History, Society and Environment
 Multiplataform Journalism
 Popular Music Studies
 Strategic and Security Studies
 Teaching Portuguese as a second language
 Writing Arts

References

NOVA University Lisbon